Hakim Bashi may refer to:
 Hakim Bashi-ye Bala
 Hakim Bashi-ye Hoseynabad